Akira Ito or Itō may refer to:

Akira Ito (footballer) (born 1972), Japanese footballer
Akira Ito (field hockey) (born 1981), Japanese field hockey player
Akira Itō (artist), Japanese manga artist
Akira Itō (painter), Japanese painter